Peace and love  may refer to:

Music
Peace & Love (festival), a Swedish music festival

Albums
Peace and Love (DJ Tatana album), 2004
Peace and Love (Edison Chen album), 2001
Peace & Love (Juliana Hatfield album), 2010
Peace and Love (The Pogues album), 1989
Peace and Love (Swingin' Utters album), 2018
Peace and Love, Inc. (Information Society album), 1992

Songs
"Peace and Love", by Fountains of Wayne from their album Welcome Interstate Managers
"Peace & Love", by Juliana Hatfield from her album Peace & Love
"Peace and Love", by Neil Young from his album Mirror Ball
"Peace and Love", by Quasi from their album When the Going Gets Dark
"Peace and Love", by the Red Hot Chili Peppers from their album Return of the Dream Canteen

Sculptures
Peace and Love (sculpture), by Ringo Starr

See also
Peace & Love City, a Swedish bandy club
Love & Peace (disambiguation)

Love
Peace